Patrik Svoboda (born 13 April 1994) is a Czech former professional football player. He made his league debut at the age of just 15 years and 341 days.

Svoboda represented his country at youth international level and was included in his country's squad for the 2011 FIFA U-17 World Cup.

References

External links
 
 
 Guardian Football

Czech footballers
1994 births
Living people
Czech Republic youth international footballers
Czech First League players
SK Kladno players
FK Dukla Prague players
Association football forwards